The 2017 Republic of Karelia head election took place on 10 September 2017, on common election day. Acting Head Artur Parfenchikov was elected for his first full term. It was the first direct Karelia head election in 15 years since Sergey Katanandov won his second term in April 2002.

Background
Head of Karelia Alexander Khudilainen was appointed in May 2012. On 8 February 2017 reports emerged that Khudilainen wouldn't run for a second term, and on 15 February he announced his resignation. Khudilainen allegedly wanted to seek reelection, however, several factors attributed to his resignation, including conflicts with local elite, poor ratings and problems with emergency shelter resettlement program. 

Federal Bailiffs Service Director Artur Parfenchikov was appointed acting Head of Karelia, among other mentioned candidates were Head of the Federal Agency for Forestry Ivan Valentik and Head of Karelian FSSP Andrey Galyamov. Parfenchikov later announced his run for a full term in office.

Regional leader of A Just Russia Irina Petelyaeva initially was rumoured to be Parfenchikov's candidate for a Federation Council, in exchange the party didn't field State Duma member Anatoly Greshnevikov against acting Governor Dmitry Mironov in Yaroslavl Oblast gubernatorial election, however, the arrangement feel through and Petelyaeva launched her campaign. One of main republican opposition parties, Yabloko declined to nominate a candidate, citing inability to pass through a municipal filter.

Candidates
Only political parties can nominate candidates for head election in Karelia, self-nomination is not possible. However, candidate is not obliged to be a member of the nominating party. Candidate for Head of Karelia should be a Russian citizen and at least 30 years old. Each candidate in order to be registered is required to collect at least 7% of signatures of members and heads of municipalities (88-92 signatures). Also gubernatorial candidates present 3 candidacies to the Federation Council and election winner later appoints one of the presented candidates.

Registered

Failed to qualify
 Igor Alpeyev (People Against Corruption), businessman
 Maria Avisheva (Young Russia), Co-Chair of the Petrozavodsk Union of Industrialists and Entrepreneurs

Eliminated in primary
 Anna Lopatkina (United Russia), Member of Legislative Assembly of the Republic of Karelia, chair of ONF regional executive committee
 Anatoly Voronin (United Russia), Rector of Petrozavodsk State University

Declined
 Galina Shirshina (Yabloko), former Mayor of Petrozavodsk (2013-2015)
 Emilia Slabunova (Yabloko), Member of Legislative Assembly of the Republic of Karelia, chair of Yabloko party

Candidates for the Federation Council
Incumbent Senator Sergey Katanandov (United Russia) was not renominated.
 Yevgeny Besedny (LDPR):
 Aleksey Orlov, Member of Legislative Assembly of the Republic of Karelia
 Yelizaveta Vasilyeva, Member of Petrozavodsk City Council, charity foundation director
 Timur Zornyakov, Member of Legislative Assembly of the Republic of Karelia

 Artur Parfenchikov (UR):
 Vitaly Krasulin, Member of Legislative Assembly of the Republic of Karelia
 Aleksandr Rakitin, Head of FSB Office in Western Military District
 Elissan Shandalovich, Chairman of Legislative Assembly of the Republic of Karelia

 Irina Petelyaeva (SR):
 Yury Davydov, Head of Chupa Urban District
 Valentina Polishchuk, chair of Russian Red Cross Society Karelian branch
 Larisa Stepanova, Member of Legislative Assembly of the Republic of Karelia

 Yevgeny Ulyanov (CPRF):
 Tatyana Bogdanova, Member of Legislative Assembly of the Republic of Karelia
 Svetlana Loginova, former Member of Legislative Assembly of the Republic of Karelia (2011-2016)
 Galina Vasilyeva, member of Petrozavodsk City Council

Opinion polls

Result

Aleksandr Rakitin was appointed to the Federation Council, replacing incumbent Senator Sergey Katanandov.

See also
2017 Russian gubernatorial elections

Notes

References

2017 elections in Russia
2017 Russian gubernatorial elections
Politics of the Republic of Karelia